Barha Tegin (665 - 680 CE) was the first ruler of the Turk Shahis. He is only known in name from the accounts of the Muslim historian Al-Biruni and reconstructions from Chinese sources, and the identification of his coinage remains conjectural.

Rule
Barha Tegin appears in history following the capture of Kabul by the Arabs under Abdur Rahman bin Samara circa 665 CE. The ruler of Kabul at that time was Ghar-ilchi of the Nezak Huns. The Arab conquest mortally weakened the Nezak Dynasty. 

The Turk Shahis under Barha Tegin, who were already ruling in Zabulistan, were then able to take control of Kabulistan. Some authors attribute the rise of Barha Tegin precisely to the weakening of the last Nezak Hun ruler Ghar-ilchi, after the successful Arab invasion under Abd al-Rahman ibn Samura.  

They then mounted a full counter-offensive and repulsed the Arabs, taking back lost territory as far as the region of Arachosia and Kandahar. Barha Tegin also moved the capital from Kapisa to Kabul.

Chinese account
According to the 726 CE account of the Korean monk Hyecho who visited the region, Barha Tegin was a former ally of the ruler of Kabul, who then usurped the throne:

According to Shōshin Kuwayama, the "A-yeh" (阿耶) in the text is not a personal name but means "father", implying that the leader of the cavalry described by Hiecho was "the father of the (current) Turkish King" (突厥王阿耶). Since the Turkish king at the time of Hyecho was Tegin Shah (680-739 CE), it is indeed his father Barha Tegin who led the "cavalry and allied himself to the king of Kapisa" before  assassinating him.

Regarding the description of the troops led by Barha Tegin, Kuwayama differs from the above translation ("he took a defeated cavalry"...), and gives: "he led an army and a tribe...", while Fuchs translates "with the troops of his entire tribe...".

Account by al-Biruni

Al-Biruni, writing his Tārīkh al-Hind ("History of India") in the 11th century, attributes the story of Barha Tegin's rise to a stratagem:

According to Shōshin Kuwayama the two accounts can be seen as a coherent whole, in which Hyecho's account describes first how Barha Tegin brought his military support and finally toppled the king in the ancient capital of Kapisi, and al-Biruni's account describes how Barha Tegin then took control of Kabul and became "Kabul Shah".

From 680 CE, Tegin Shah, son of Barha Tegin, became the king of the Turk Shahis. Barha Tegin had a second son named Rutbil, who seceded, and founded the Zunbil dynasty in Zabulistan.

Coinage

The initial coinage of the Turk Shahi initially adopted the Nezak Hun types, with the bull-head crown, but with blundered Pahlavi legends. Still the minting quality was fine, and the metal of the coins was of a higher quality. Some completely new types of copper coins soon appear, with a ruler in Central Asian caftan on the front, and an animal such as an elephant or a bull on the back, in place of the traditional Sasanian fire altar, together with the Turk Shahis tamgha.  
 
According to Kuwayama, the coinage of Barha Tegin corresponds to the early silver coins marked "Shri Shahi" ( Srio Shaho, "Lord King"), and to the copper coinage depicting a Turkic ruler with three-crescent crown and wolf-head with the Brahmi script legend "Sri Ranasrikari" ( Sri Ranasrikari, "The Lord who brings excellence through war").

References

Notes

Sources

  
 
 
 
 

 
 

Turkic dynasties
Dynasties of Afghanistan
Kabul Shahi